Defiance is a book, first published 1951 in Calcutta, by Savitri Devi. It is a memoir of her arrest, trial, and imprisonment on the charge of distributing National Socialist propaganda in Germany in 1949.

The book is dedicated to Herta Ehlert and opens with quotations from the Bhagawad Gita and Adolf Hitler.

External links
Full text of Defiance at the Savitri Devi Archive

1951 non-fiction books
Books by Savitri Devi